Pouncet Island is an island located in Nunavut's Kitikmeot Region within the northern Canadian Arctic.

References

Islands of the Gulf of Boothia
Uninhabited islands of Kitikmeot Region